Glycine tomentella, called the woolly glycine or rusty glycine, is a species of soybean found in Australia, New Guinea, New Caledonia, the Philippines, Taiwan and southeast coastal China. In Australia, it is found in  New South Wales, Queensland, the Northern Territory and Western Australia. Glycine tomentella is a complex of polyploid forms, with 2n=38, 2n=40, 2n=78 and 2n=80 chromosome counts detected in different populations. All four forms are found in Australia, the 40chromosome and 78chromosome forms are also found in New Guinea, and the 80chromosome form is found across the entire range.

References

External links
 Glycine tomentosa occurrence data from GBIF

tomentella
Plants described in 1920
Taxa named by Bunzō Hayata
Fabales of Asia
Fabales of Australia